The Music Cartel was a record label based in Port Washington, New York and active between 1998 and 2005. It was founded by former Earache Records general manager Eric Lemasters. Many of their critically acclaimed releases – including prominent stoner rock records – were also released in Europe on Rise Above Records.

Discography

TMC001CD Industrial Fuckin Strength 2: Unleash the Brutality compilation CD
TMC002CD Industrial Strength Anthology 1: The Lost Tracks compilation CD
TMC003CD Transport League – Super Evil CD
TMC004CD Codeseven – A Sense of Coalition CD
TMC005CD I.D.K. – Till Death Do Us Part CD
TMC006CD Leadfoot – Bring It On CD
TMC007CD Peace, Love & Pitbulls – PLP3 CD
TMC008CD Panacea – Twisted Designz CD
TMC009CD Aura Anthropica – American Blindfold CD
TMC010CD Lid – In the Mushroom CD
TMC011CD Roachpowder – Viejo Diablo CD
TMC012CD Sleep –  Jerusalem CD
TMC013CD Sounds from the Electronic Lounge compilation CD
TMC014CD In the Groove compilation CD
TMC015CD Sheavy – The Electric Sleep CD
TMC016CD Orange Goblin – Time Travelling Blues CD
TMC017CD Airport – Monostar CD
TMC018CD Clawfinger – Clawfinger CD
TMC019CD Terra Firma – Terra Firma CD
TMC019 Terra Firma – Spiral Guru Pic Disc 7"
TMC020CD Plastique – Empire of the Black Suns CD
TMC021CD Electric Wizard – Come My Fanatics... CD
TMC022CD Mammoth Volume – Mammoth Volume CD
TMC023CD Codeseven – Division of Labour CD
TMC024CD Clusterfuck compilation CD
TMC025CD Zenith – Flowers of Intelligence CD
TMC026CD Orange Goblin – Frequencies from Planet Ten CD
TMC027CD Headcase – Mushiness CD
TMC028CD Leadfoot – Take a Look CD
TMC029CD Hangnail – Ten Days Before Summer CD
TMC030CD Rise 13:Magick Rock Vol. 1 compilation CD
TMC031CD Cathedral – In Memoriam CD
TMC032CD Sally – Sally CD
TMC033CD Clawfinger – Two Sides CD
TMC034CD Hans Platzgumer – Datacard
TMC035CD/LP Mammoth Volume – Noara Dance CD/LP
TMC036CD/LP Orange Goblin – The Big Black CD/LP
TMC037CD Sheavy – Celestial Hi-Fi CD
TMC038CD Sea of Green – Northern Lights CD
TMC039CD The Bronx Casket Co. – The Bronx Casket Company CD
TMC040CD Dreadnaught – Down to Zero CD
TMC041CD Firebird – Firebird CD
TMC042CD Shallow – 16 Sunsets in 24 Hours CD
TMC043CD Roachpowder – Atomic Church CD
TMC044CD Electric Wizard – Dopethrone CD
TMC045CD Sea of Green – Time to Fly CD
TMC046CD Sloth – The Voice of God CD
TMC047CD Deride – Scars of Time CD
TMC048CD Hangnail – Clouds in the Head CD
TMC049CD Mammoth Volume – Single Book of Songs CD
TMC050CD Lenny Dee – IFS3: 667 Neighbor of the Beast 2CD
TMC051CD Sons of Otis – Songs for Worship CD
TMC052CD Goliath – Gate CD
TMC053CD The Bronx Casket Co. – Sweet Home Transylvania CD
TMC054CD Lenny Dee – Ruff Beats Records One Step Back 2CD
TMC055CD Grand Magus – Grand Magus CD
TMC056CD The Sabians – Beauty for Ashes CD
TMC057CD Supersuckers – Splitsville 1 CD
TMC058CD Mammoth Volume – Early Years CD
TMC059CD Brant Bjork – Brant Bjork & the Operators CD
TMC060LP Electric Wizard – Let Us Prey LP
TMC061CD Orange Goblin – Coup de Grace CD
TMC062CD Codeseven – The Rescue CD
TMC063LP Sons of Otis – Untitled 10"
TMC064CD The Last Drop – Where Were You Living a Year from Now? CD
TMC065CD Rebirth of the Heavy compilation CD
TMC066CD Deride – First Round Knockout CD
TMC067CD Sheavy – Synchronized CD
TMC068CD Lenny Dee – IFS4 - Chillin Is Killin 2CD
TMC069CD Murder 1 – On High CD
TMC070CD Sea of Green – Chemical Vacation CD
TMC071CD Rondellus – Sabbatum: A Medieval Tribute to Black Sabbath CD
TMC072CD Unearthly Trance – Season of Seance, Science of Silence CD
TMC073CD Ufomammut – Snailking CD
TMC074CD The Sabians – Shiver CD
TMC075CD Dust to Dust – Sick CD
TMC076CD Dirty Rig – Blood, Sweat and Beer CD
TMC077CD/LP Grand Magus – Monument CD/LP
TMC078CD Orange Goblin – Thieving from the House of God CD
TMC079CD Rebirth of the Heavy Vol. II compilation CD
TMC080CD Witchcraft – Witchcraft CD
TMC081CD Electric Wizard – We Live CD
TMC082CD Unearthly Trance – In the Red CD

See also
 List of record labels

References

Record labels established in 1998
Record labels disestablished in 2005
1998 establishments in New York (state)
2005 disestablishments in New York (state)
Companies based in Nassau County, New York
Rock record labels
Psychedelic rock record labels
Heavy metal record labels
Doom metal record labels
Defunct record labels of the United States